Undulambia cantiusalis is a moth in the family Crambidae. It was described by William Schaus in 1924. It is found in Peru.

The wingspan is about 15 mm. The wings are white, with light orange-yellow markings.

References

Moths described in 1924
Musotiminae